Ola Opesan (born 1966) is a Nigerian-British writer, journalist and educationist. He published his first novel, Another Lonely Londoner (1991), under the pseudonym Gbenga Agbenugba.

Life
Ola Opesan was born in London to Nigerian parents in 1966. He returned with his family to Nigeria when he was ten years old, going to school there, and attending the University of Ife. He returned to London to study scriptwriting, completing a TV and video course, and writing several screenplays.

While in London Opesan read Sam Selvon's novel The Lonely Londoners, and in response wrote his own novel, Another Lonely Londoner. Written in a mix of English and Nigerian pidgin, the novel deals with the experience of young Nigerians in London. Alienated as an immigrant by his encounter with British racism, the novel's protagonist Akin eventually decides to return to Nigeria:

In 1996-7 Opesan was editor of the Nigerian lifestyle magazine Ovation. In 1997 he published his second novel, Many Rivers to Cross, under his own name. In 1999 he became the editor of another lifestyle magazine, Omega. He also contributed an essay on African businesses in the UK to the 2000 Penguin anthology IC3.

Opesan gained a BA in Business Studies from the University of East London and a MA in Mass Communications from the University of Leicester before training as a secondary school maths teacher. He became head of mathematics and later assistant head teacher at George Mitchell School in Leyton. In 2007 he moved to Lagos as the founding Principal of Meadow Hall School, Lekki, Lagos. There he has also authored an introductory book about Nigerian history, Nigeria in 101 Headlines.

Works

As Gbenga Agbenugba
 Another Lonely Londoner. London: Ronu Books, 1991.

As Ola Opesan
 Many Rivers to Cross. London: X Press, 1996. 
 'The proliferation of African businesses in the UK: will Africans be the new Asians of UK business', in Courttia Newland & Kadija Sesay, eds., IC3: the Penguin Book of New Black Writing in Britain, London: Penguin, 2000, pp. 197–206.
 Lyricism: journey to the centre of the mind. London: Ronu Books, 2013.
 Nigeria in 101 headlines: the past, a lamp to the future. London: Ronu Books, 2015. Illustrated by Tosin Kajopelaye-Ola and Pere Frey.

References

1966 births
Living people
English novelists
Nigerian novelists
English people of Nigerian descent
Nigerian educators
Writers from London
Obafemi Awolowo University alumni
Alumni of the University of East London
Alumni of the University of Leicester